The Brazilian Linguistics Association (abbreviated as "ABRALIN" from the Brazilian Portuguese Associação Brasileira de Lingüística) is an organization intended to bring together professionals in the field of linguistics in order to promote, develop, and disseminate information about theoretical and applied linguistics to students and interested community members in Brazil. The organization hosts scientific conferences, courses, and publications.

The association was founded on January 9, 1969, in an assembly presided over by Professor Joaquim Mattoso Câmara Júnior, in São Paulo.

The first administration (1969–1971) consisted of the following people:

President: Aryon Dall'Igna Rodrigues (Museu Nacional-RJ)
Secretary: Francisco Gomes de Matos (UFPE)
Treasurer: Maria Marta Coelho (UFRJ)
Advisors:
Ataliba Teixeira de Castilho (FFCL-Marília/SP)
Geraldo Calábria Lapenda (UFPE)
Isaac Nicolau Salum (USP)
Joaquim Mattoso Câmara Júnior (UFRJ)
Jürn Philipson (USP)
Nelson Rossi (UFBA)

Today, the ABRALIN headquarters is located at Universidade Estadual de Campinas (UNICAMP)

Presidents

External links
Official Home Page (Portuguese)

Linguistics organizations